The MR-UR-100 Sotka was a MIRV-warhead intercontinental ballistic missile (ICBM) developed and deployed by the Soviet Union from 1978 to 1993. The missile was given the NATO reporting name SS-17 Spanker and was built under the Soviet industry designation 15A15. An alternative designation for the missile is the UR-100MR.

Development
OKB-586 developed the MR-UR-100 project. The purpose was to develop a MIRV capable replacement for the existing UR-100 missiles in service. While designed to fit into existing UR-100 silos, it still required some modification of existing silos to accommodate the new missile, due to its requirement for a cold launch system.

The development of "modernized UR-100" was authorized on 19 August 1970 (document No.682-218) and assigned to both OKB-586 and TsKBM (builder of UR-100). The design bureau conducted flight tests from 1971 through 1974. Deployment commenced in December 1978. The more advanced MR-UR-100UTTh version began development in 1979, with flight tests from 1977 through 1979. The new missiles had completely replaced the original version by 1983, at which time the Soviets fielded 270 launchers. From there the number of launchers declined, and by the 1991 START I Treaty they were down to 76. All were scheduled for dismantling and removed from the inventory.

In fiction
In the historical fiction novel The Third World War, written by General Sir John Hackett, a warhead from a MR-UR-100 detonates 3500m above Birmingham, England at 10:30 hours GMT on 20 August 1985. The explosion kills 300,000 people within minutes, with a further 250,000 likely to die in the aftermath.

Operator
   The Strategic Rocket Forces were the only operators of the Sotka.

See also
 List of missiles
 List of rockets

References

External links
 15A15 

MR-UR-100
Cold War intercontinental ballistic missiles of the Soviet Union
MR-UR-100
Military equipment introduced in the 1970s